Ian Ronald Khan (born 1 July 1976) is a Canadian former international cricketer who represented the Canadian national team at the 2004 ICC Six Nations Challenge. He played as a right-arm pace bowler.

A former Canada under-19s player, Khan was selected in Canada's initial 38-man training squad for the 2003 World Cup, but did not make the final squad of 15. In 2004, he was selected in Canada's squad for the Six Nations Challenge in the United Arab Emirates, where matches held List A status. Khan played in three of his team's five matches, but had little impact, bowling only 5.3 overs in total. His only wicket came against the United Arab Emirates, where he finished with 1/27 from 2.3 overs.

References

External links
Player profile and statistics at Cricket Archive
Player profile and statistics at ESPNcricinfo

1976 births
Living people
Canadian cricketers
Cricketers from Ontario
Sportspeople from Scarborough, Toronto